The Diemelsee or Diemel Reservoir is a reservoir with a surface area of 1.65 km² and about capacity of 19.9 million m³ on the River Diemel in the counties of Waldeck-Frankenberg in North Hesse, and Hochsauerlandkreis, Westphalia, Germany.

It is part of the Diemeltalsperre hydropower system (DiT) comprising the Diemel Dam, the equalizing basin, the power plant and the reservoir itself, owned by the Federal Waterway and Navigation Authority and managed by its Hann. Münden office. The Diemel Reservoir, along with the Edersee is part of the water regulation structure in the catchment area of the River Weser.

Location 
The Diemelsee is located a few kilometres northeast of the Upland in the northeastern foothills of the Rothaar Mountains that lie in the northeast of the Rhenish Massif. It lies mainly within the county of Waldeck-Frankenberg, its smaller northern section and its dam belong to the county of Hochsauerlandkreis. In is also within the Diemelsee Nature Park between Willingen and Marsberg on the territory of Diemelsee and the borough of Marsberg on the River Diemel and its tributary, the Itter. Its dam stands about 500 metres south of the village of Helminghausen (southwest of Marsberg). The only shoreline village is Heringhausen.

The Diemelsee lies in a forested Central Upland countryside, whose highest point in the vicinity of the reservoir is the Köpfchen (ca. ; west of the Itterarm in the west). Immediately east-southeast of the dam rises the Eisenberg (594.6 m) and a few kilometres to the south of the dam is the mountain of Koppen (715.1 m).

Panorama

See also 
 List of dams in Germany

References

Literature 
 Peter Franke, Wolfgang Frey: Talsperren in der Bundesrepublik Deutschland. Herausgegeben vom Nationalen Komitee für Grosse Talsperren in der Bundesrepublik Deutschland (DNK) und Deutscher Verband für Wasserwirtschaft und Kulturbau e. V. (DVWK), Systemdruck-GmbH, Berlin, 1987, .
 Paul Gerecke: Die Diemeltalsperre. In: Zeitschrift für Bauwesen, 75th annual, 10th–12th issue (Ingenieurbauteil), 1925, pp. 93–104.

External links 

 Hann. Münden Waterway and Navigation Office: Diemel Dam and other dams at wsv.de

Reservoirs in Hesse
Reservoirs in North Rhine-Westphalia
RDiemelsee
Dams in Hesse
Dams in North Rhine-Westphalia
Sauerland
Waldeck-Frankenberg
Hochsauerlandkreis
1920s architecture
Gravity dams